Konara Mudiyanselage Chaminda Bandara (born 22 May 1987) is a professional Sri Lankan cricketer. In June 2016, he was added to Sri Lanka's squad for the third Test against England, after Dushmantha Chameera was ruled out through injury.

Domestic career
Bandara is a past pupil of St. Mary's College, Kegalle. He has played for five years in the domestic arena with 51 first-class matches and has taken 141 wickets. He took figures of 9 for 68 in his final first-class game before he represented his national team. The match was played in March against Sri Lanka Army Sports Club. During the AIA Premier League Tournament, in the 2015/16 season, Bandara was the only fast-bowler to feature in the top 15 wicket-takers list. He took 33 wickets from 9 matches at an average of 26.30.

International career
On 2 July 2016 he made his One Day International (ODI) debut for Sri Lanka against England. He conceded 83 runs in ten overs, giving away eleven boundaries. His bowling figures are the worst by a Sri Lanka player on ODI debut. This is also the most by a bowler from a Full-Member side in a 50-over ODI. Sri Lanka lost the match by 133 runs and lost the series 3–0. On 5 July 2016 he made his Twenty20 International (T20I) debut for Sri Lanka against England.

References

External links
 

1987 births
Living people
Sri Lankan cricketers
Sri Lanka One Day International cricketers
Sri Lanka Twenty20 International cricketers
Kandy Youth Cricket Club cricketers
Sinhalese Sports Club cricketers
People from Sabaragamuwa Province